Kanchanamala (1917–1981) was an Indian actress known for her works in Telugu cinema.

Personal life
She was born in Tenali, Andhra Pradesh. During her childhood days, she went to live with her uncle who was a violin teacher. She was married to Gali Venkaiah, who died of tuberculosis.

Career

She started her film career in Srikrishna Tulabharam, in a minor role as Mitravinda in 1935. The film was based on a play by Telugu cinema's first lyricist Chandala Kesava Dasu. Relangi played a bit role in the movie.

She captured the audience with her beauty and played lead roles in films such as Veerabhimanyu, Gruhalakshmi and Malapilla.

During his stint as a production director with Vel Pictures, Ramabrahmam felt that she was not fit for acting and rejected her. As she rose in her career, he realised he was wrong and signed her for the harijan village girl Sampalatha in Malapilla, based on Gudipaati Venkata Chalam's unpublished novelette. Sceptics commented that she was a misfit for such a complex character. But she rendered a scintillating performance in the first half as an illiterate downtrodden village belle and as the literate modern city woman in the later portions.

Her next role was as Uthara in Veerabhimanyu (1936) produced by Sagar Movietone in Bombay. Kodavatiganti Kutumba Rao debuted as a screenwriter with this film. Mesmerised by her beauty, Jaddan Bai, actor and producer and mother of Hindi cinema's most elegant actress, Nargis, asked her to act in Hindi films. Mehaboob Khan and popular hero of the time Motilal also told her to learn Hindi so that they could make her a big star in Hindi cinema.  Kanchanamal, still a teenager, spurned their offers. Her third starring role, Vipra Narayana catapulted her to stardom.

In Vandemataram, Chittoor Subrahmanya Pillai's Madhuranagarilo challanamma bodhu was used as a duet rendered by Nagaiah and Kanchanamala. Under the production of Gemini Movies, Kanchanamala signed a contract for the role of Nagamma in the movie Bala nagamma which included clause to work only under Gemini movies. During the filming of the movie, she had differences with the director and producer S. S. Vasan which led to legal entanglement. Unable to work in movies outside Gemini movies and having lost her husband caused despair and led to mental imbalance.

She later moved into her sister's place in her hometown Tenali.

Cultural impact
Mothers of those days used to put their child to sleep humming this lullaby, "Dina Dinamu Papadni Deevinchi pondi Devalokamuloni Devathallaara", first performed by Kanchanamala.

Kanchanamala's photograph from the Malapilla film's promotional calendar adorned many homes and she generated such a "craze" among the cinema patrons.

Filmography

References
 
కలగానే మిగిలిన కలలరాణి సినీ ప్రయాణం

External links
 

1917 births
1981 deaths
Indian film actresses
20th-century Indian actresses
Telugu actresses
People from Tenali
Actresses from Andhra Pradesh
Actresses in Telugu cinema